Yanesabad (also Romanized as Yānesābād; also known as Yūnesābād) is a village in Kuhpayeh-e Sharqi Rural District, in the Central District of Abyek County, Qazvin Province, Iran. At the 2006 census, its population was 257, in 78 families.

References 

Populated places in Abyek County